A roof rack is a set of bars secured to the roof of a motor car. It is used to carry bulky items such as luggage, bicycles, canoes, kayaks, skis, or various carriers and containers.

They allow users of an automobile to transport objects on the roof of the vehicle without reducing interior space for occupants, or the cargo area volume limits such as in the typical car's trunk design. These include car top weatherproof containers, some designed for specific cargo such as skis or luggage.

History 
There is a long history of the use of roof racks and their designs.

Until the late 1970s, almost all regular passenger automobiles had rain gutters. These gutters are formed by the welded flange (raised rim or lip) on the left and right sides of the car's metal roof panel. This made attaching an accessory or aftermarket roof rack a relatively simple process.

The first mass production cars without any visible rain gutters were the 1975 AMC Pacer and Chevrolet Monza. Other vehicles were introduced on the market with hidden rain gutters during the 1980s, and by 1990, vehicles with external rain gutters were becoming rare.

Roof rack suppliers developed new products designed to securely attach to various types of automobile roofs.

Types 
The most common components of a roof rack system are: towers, fitting pieces (for attaching towers to a specific vehicle), crossbars, and gear mounts.

Automobile roof racks are split into different types, depending on the vehicle roof:
 Rain Gutter - older roof racks were usually mounted directly to the gutter surrounding the roof line. 
 Bare Roof - many modern vehicles, which do not have gutters, can have a roof rack installed by attaching hooks to the top of the door frames.
 Fixed Point - some automobiles have fittings for proprietary racks which mate with reinforced lugs in the roof, or have pre-threaded screwholes. 
 Side Rails - vehicles with factory-installed rails, which may be flush against the roof or raised off of the roof, running front-to-back on the roof
 Factory Bars - other vehicles have a factory-installed permanent roof rack.

There are many factors in the selection and use of roof racks. Some of these include: their weight and strength, the profile for loading and unloading, as well as any available accessories.

Roof racks increase air resistance and in the US, roof racks increased overall fuel consumption by approximately 1%. Due to greater wind resistance, roof racks may increase wind noise on the highway. Mounting the roof rack backwards may reduce air resistance. Some bars are designed with a lower drag coefficient or have a wind deflector at the front to reduce this problem.

When installing roof racks, it is important to load the bars properly, in accordance with the owner's manual. When driving on road, one needs to load the allowed weight minus the weight of the roof rack kit. If one plans using the roof racks for off-road drive, the allowed weight should be divided by 2, and this will be the amount, allowed to carry on the roof racks in such driving conditions.

Truck bed rack is a derivation of a roof rack designed to be installed over the bed of a pickup truck. The construction of a bed rack features tall tubes (legs) that allow to the rack platform to be higher above the bed surface and also leave space for cargo inside of the bed. Pickup truck racks form a long cargo platform that allows transportation of oversized items. They are used in constructions and recreation as a base for various work, sport, and recreational gear such as ladders, surf boards, tents, etc.

References 

Automotive body parts